Keisuke Otoguro (乙黒圭祐, Otoguro Keisuke, born 16 November 1996) is a Japanese wrestler. He competed in the men's freestyle 74 kg event at the 2020 Summer Olympics held in Tokyo, Japan.

At the 2018 World Wrestling Championships held in Budapest, Hungary, he competed in the men's 70 kg event where he was eliminated in his first match by Ikhtiyor Navruzov of Uzbekistan.

References

External links
 

1996 births
Living people
Japanese male sport wrestlers
Olympic wrestlers of Japan
Wrestlers at the 2020 Summer Olympics
Sportspeople from Yamanashi Prefecture
21st-century Japanese people